The 2016 West Virginia Senate elections were held on November 8, 2016, as part of the biennial United States elections. Seventeen of West Virginia's 34 state senators were up for regular selection, along with an unexpired term for another seat. West Virginia Senate districts each have two elected representatives. State senators serve staggered four-year terms in West Virginia, with one senator from each district up in even-numbered years corresponding to presidential election years (such as 2016), and the other up in even-numbered years corresponding to presidential midterm years.

Primary elections in the state were held on May 10. After the previous 2014 state elections, Republicans held a slim majority in the Senate, holding 18 seats to the Democrats' 16. The Republican Party had long been the minority party in the Mountain State, but the decline of the strength of coal worker unions, the Democratic Party's increasing focus on environmentalism, the unpopularity of President Barack Obama, and the increasing social conservatism of the Republican Party have helped the GOP solidify power in the state rapidly since 2000.

The high popularity of candidate Donald Trump within the state and his 42-point margin of victory, helped the Republicans gain four seats. This can be attributed to the increasing association of the West Virginia Democratic Party with the national Democratic Party, and a strong year for the Republican Party nationally, in which they gained control of the presidency, and kept control of the U.S. House of Representatives and U.S. Senate. Donald Trump won West Virginia with 68.5% of the vote, his largest share of the vote in any state. Trump's performance helped Republican Senate candidates down-ballot, as he won every senate district in the state.

Following the state's 2016 Senate elections, Republicans maintained and increased their control of the Senate with 22 seats to the Democrats' 12.

Retirements

Four incumbents did not run for re-election in 2016. Those incumbents are:

Republicans

District 6: Bill Cole: Retired to run in the 2016 Gubernatorial Election.

Democrats

District 2: Jeff Kessler: Retired to run in the 2016 Gubernatorial Election.
District 10: William Laird: Retired
District 16: Herb Snyder: Retired

Incumbents defeated

In primary elections
Two incumbents were defeated in the May 10 primaries. Senator Bob Ashley was appointed to the 3rd Senate District and was the incumbent for the remainder of the unexpired term. However, Ashley chose to challenge fellow incumbent Senator Donna Boley for a full term.

Republican
District 3: Bob Ashley lost nomination to fellow incumbent Donna Boley.

Democrat 

 District 7: Art Kirkendoll lost renomination to Richard Ojeda.

In the general election

Republican 

 District 8: Chris Walters lost to Glenn Jeffries.

Democrats
District 1: Jack Yost lost to Ryan Weld.
District 14: Bob Williams lost to Randy Smith.

Results summary

All results are certified by the Secretary of State of West Virginia.

Close races

Summary of results by State Senate District

Detailed results by State Senate District

All results are certified by the Secretary of State of West Virginia.

District 1

District 2

District 3
In 2016, both seats were up for election due to an unusual series of events. Republican Bob Ashley, who had been appointed to the Senate following the departure of David Nohe in 2015, chose to run in a primary against his fellow senator Donna Boley, leaving his own seat open and triggering a special election.

Regular

Special

District 4

District 5

District 6

District 7

District 8

District 9

District 10

District 11

District 12

District 13

District 14

District 15

District 16

District 17

Notes

References

Senate 2016
Election 2016
West Virginia Senate
West Virginia Senate elections